New Hampshire Route 3A is a designation held by two separate state highways in New Hampshire. The two segments, although not directly connected, are linked by U.S. Route 3, from which they derive their route number.

Route description

Southern segment
The southern terminus of the  southern segment is at the Massachusetts state line in Hudson, where it continues south as Massachusetts Route 3A. The northern terminus is in the city of Concord at US 3. This segment of NH 3A follows the Merrimack River for its entire length. The route begins in Hudson at the Massachusetts line and shortly intersects the eastern end of the Nashua Circumferential Highway, which provides access to US 3 and the F.E. Everett Turnpike. NH 3A passes through Hudson Village, the historic center of town, where it intersects with NH 111 just across the river from downtown Nashua. NH 102 begins at this intersection and is cosigned with NH 3A for its first mile, before 3A splits to the north west, while 102 continues on towards Londonderry. NH 3A continues along the eastern bank of the river, through Litchfield and into the city of Manchester, where it crosses under I-293/NH 101 and follows a short surface alignment in the southwest section of town. NH 3A intersects with US 3 and is actually cosigned with it (in a wrong-way concurrency) on Queen City Avenue across the river, where the two routes intersect NH 114A at its eastern terminus. At this point, NH 3A leaves US 3 and merges onto I-293 northbound (which also carries the Everett Turnpike) at exit 4. The highway immediately interchanges with I-93 (which it parallels for the remainder of its length) near the northern terminus of I-293, and continues north (now paralleling on the west side of the river). Hackett Hill Road provides another access point to I-93, while nearby Main Street connects to US 3/NH 28 across the river. NH 3A enters Bow and meets the southern end of the I-89 freeway before crossing into the city limits of Concord. The highway interchanges with I-93 one last time before ending at US 3 just south of downtown Concord.

Northern segment

The southern terminus of the  northern segment is in the city of Franklin at US 3, NH 11, and NH 127. Where US 3 takes a more easterly route from here, NH 3A continues due north, following the western bank of the Pemigewasset River along North Main Street. North of Franklin, it enters the town of Hill, continuing to follow the Pemigewasset, passing through the William H. Thomas State Forest on the way to the town of Bristol. It forms the main commercial thoroughfare through Bristol, with a brief concurrency with NH 104 in the center of town, following first South Main Street, then Pleasant Street, and finally Lake Street. At Bristol, 3A leaves the Pemigewasset, which turns east here, and continues north into Bridgewater and the southern shores of Newfound Lake. Following the Mayhew Turnpike along the eastern side of Newfound Lake through Bridgewater, 3A continues through rural areas on the eastern side of Hebron and the western side of Plymouth. In Plymouth, the route joins with NH 25 and heads due east to rejoin US 3 at an interchange with Interstate 93, US 3 and NH 25, which is the northern terminus of this segment.

History

From 1922 to 1926, Route 3A was part of the New England road marking system as New England Route 6A (NE-6A). In 1926, all roads designated as NE-6A were changed to New Hampshire Route 3A and Massachusetts Route 3A to accommodate the change of New England Route 6 to U.S. Route 3.

Junction list

Southern segment

Northern segment

See also
 New Hampshire Route 132, once designated New Hampshire Route 3B

References

External links

Southern segment
Map of southern terminus
Map of northern terminus

Northern segment
Map of southern terminus
Map of northern terminus

003A
Transportation in Hillsborough County, New Hampshire
Transportation in Merrimack County, New Hampshire
Transportation in Grafton County, New Hampshire
U.S. Route 3